James Keddy (born 26 March 1973) is an Irish football coach and former player who is currently manager at Wexford FC.

Career
Keddy made his League of Ireland debut for Home Farm on 13 October 1991. He joined UCD in 1994 and his other clubs have included Derry City, Shelbourne, Dundalk, Shamrock Rovers, Bohemians and Drogheda United.

Keddy helped Shelbourne win the double of the League of Ireland and FAI Cup in 2000. Keddy received another FAI Cup winners medal as part of the Dundalk cup winning squad of 2002.

He was signed by Liam Buckley for Shamrock Rovers in June 2002 and went on to make a total of 65 appearances, scoring 9 goals, in his two seasons at Rovers. This included 6 appearances in the UEFA Cup and the UEFA Intertoto Cup.

Keddy rejoined former club Shelbourne on 29 November 2007.

Keddy received his first League of Ireland manager appointment in 2022 with Wexford FC

Honours
UCD
League of Ireland First Division (1): 1994–95
League of Ireland First Division Shield (1): 1994–95
Leinster Senior Cup (2): 1994–95, 1995–96

Derry City
League of Ireland Premier Division (1): 1996–97

Shelbourne
 League of Ireland Premier Division (1): 1999–2000
FAI Cup (1): 2000

Dundalk
FAI Cup (1): 2002

Drogheda United
League of Ireland Premier Division (1): 2007
Setanta Sports Cup (2): 2006, 2007

References

External links
 James Keddy the future of Irish football (Irish Times 26 Mar 2015)
James Keddy's profile at www.shelbournefc.com
James Keddy's profile at www.droghedaunited.ie

1973 births
Living people
Association footballers from County Dublin
Republic of Ireland association footballers
League of Ireland players
Shelbourne F.C. players
Drogheda United F.C. players
Bohemian F.C. players
Shamrock Rovers F.C. players
Dundalk F.C. players
Derry City F.C. players
University College Dublin A.F.C. players
Home Farm F.C. players
Association football wingers
Association football defenders
Bray Wanderers A.F.C. non-playing staff